Robert Chester is an American military officer and lawyer.  Chester is a Colonel in the United States Marine Corps.

Chester has recently been appointed to serve as President of the Guantanamo military commission faced by Omar Khadr.

On January 12, 2006, he admonished Khadr's prosecutor, Colonel Morris Davis, to show more respect to Khadr.  He instructed him to start referring to Khadr as "Mr Khadr".

See also

References
  Army pathologist concedes errors in prisoner abuse case, Tao, October 14, 2004
  U.S. prosecutor in Khadr case blasts sympathetic views of Canadian teen, CBC, January 10, 2006
  U.S. prosecutor's comments on Khadr reviewed, Toronto Star, January 12, 2006

Living people
Guantanamo Military Commission members
United States Marine Corps colonels
Place of birth missing (living people)
Year of birth missing (living people)
American military lawyers